Laccophilus maculosus, the dingy diver, is a species of predaceous diving beetle in the family Dytiscidae. It is found in Central America and North America.

Subspecies
These three subspecies belong to the species Laccophilus maculosus:
 Laccophilus maculosus decipiens LeConte, 1852 i c g b
 Laccophilus maculosus maculosus Say, 1823 i c g b
 Laccophilus maculosus shermani Leech, 1944 i c g b
Data sources: i = ITIS, c = Catalogue of Life, g = GBIF, b = Bugguide.net

References

Further reading

External links

 

Dytiscidae
Articles created by Qbugbot
Beetles described in 1823